Nick or  Nicholas Evans may refer to:

Arts and entertainment
 Nick Evans (trombonist) (born 1947), British jazz trombonist with the Keith Tippett Group, Soft Machine and others
 Nicholas Evans (1950–2022), English screenwriter and journalist
 Nicholas Evans (artist) (born 1907), Welsh artist

Sports
 Nick Evans (baseball) (born 1986), American baseball player
 Nick Evans (cricketer) (born 1954), English cricketer
 Nick Evans (rugby union) (born 1980), New Zealand rugby union footballer

Others
 Nicholas Evans (linguist) (born 1956), Australian linguist specializing in Indigenous Australian languages

See also
Nicky Evans (disambiguation)